This article lists the chapters of Sigma Pi fraternity. They are listed by the chapter's charter year, along with their Greek-letter designation and the school name. An official list of all chapters, both active and dormant, can be found by clicking the Sigma Pi Fraternity International website link to the List of Sigma Pi Chapters

One hundred man chapters
These chapters were recognized at the 2018 Convocation with the Merino/Tash 100 Man Chapter Award.

 Beta, Indiana University
 Alpha-Delta, Auburn University
 Alpha-Omicron, UC Santa Barbara
 Beta-Mu, University of Mississippi
 Zeta-Eta, Santa Clara University
 Iota-Eta, UC Santa Cruz
 Alpha Phi,  University of Georgia

Chapters

Statistics

Original Charters by Decade

Charters by State or Province

There have never been Sigma Pi chapters in the states of Alaska, Hawaii, Idaho, Maine, Montana, Nebraska, North Dakota, South Dakota, Vermont, Wyoming, or the District of Columbia.  All of the fraternity's Canadian chapters have been in the province of Ontario.

References

Lists of chapters of United States student societies by society
chapters